Josa is a genus of South American anyphaenid sac spiders first described by Eugen von Keyserling in 1891. It is a senior synonym of "Gayenella", "Haptisus", "Olbophthalmus", and "Pelayo".

Species
 it contains fifteen species:

 Josa analis (Simon, 1897)—Venezuela
 Josa andesiana (Berland, 1913)—Ecuador
 Josa bryantae (Caporiacco, 1955)—Venezuela
 Josa calilegua Ramírez, 2003—Argentina
 Josa chazaliae (Simon, 1897)—Colombia
 Josa gounellei (Simon, 1897)—Brazil
 Josa keyserlingi (L. Koch, 1866)—Colombia, Brazil
 Josa laeta (O. Pickard-Cambridge, 1896)—Costa Rica
 Josa lojensis (Berland, 1913)—Ecuador
 Josa lutea (Keyserling, 1878)—Colombia, Ecuador
 Josa maura (Simon, 1897)—Venezuela
 Josa nigrifrons (Simon, 1897)—Mexico to Bolivia
 Josa personata (Simon, 1897)—Ecuador
 Josa riveti (Berland, 1913)—Ecuador, Bolivia
 Josa simoni (Berland, 1913)—Ecuador

References

External links

 

Anyphaenidae
Araneomorphae genera
Taxa named by Eugen von Keyserling